Loose coupling is a system of software components that have little or no knowledge of the definitions of other components.

Loose coupling may also mean:
Loose coupling, applied to organizational settings by Karl E. Weick
Loose coupling in electronics, where an inductively coupled circuit has a low coupling coefficient